Bilhorod-Dnistrovskyi (Russian: Белгород-Днестровский, romanized: Belgorod-Dnestrovskiy), historically known as Akkerman or under different names, is a city, municipality and port situated on the right bank of the Dniester Liman (on the Dniester estuary leading to the Black Sea) in Odesa Oblast of southwestern Ukraine, in the historical region of Budjak. It also serves as the administrative center of Bilhorod-Dnistrovskyi Raion, one of seven districts of Odesa Oblast, and is the only locality which constitutes Bilhorod-Dnistrovskyi urban hromada, one of the hromadas of Ukraine. It is a location of a big freight seaport. Population:

Nomenclature 
The city of Bilhorod-Dnistrovskyi is also referred to by alternative transliterations from Ukrainian as Bilhorod-Dnistrovsky or Bilhorod-Dnistrovskyy. Dnistrovsky was added to differentiate it from Belgorod (in Ukrainian Bilhorod), a city in Russia, when both were a part of the Soviet Union.

Previous names
 Ophiusa (Οφιούσα), Phoenician colony (meaning "city of snakes" in Greek)
 Tyras (Τύρας), Ancient Greek colony (also the Greek name for the River Dniester)
 Asprokastron ("White Castle"), Greek name in Antiquity and the Middle Ages. Name attested from 944 to 1484 AD.
 Maurokastron (Μαυρόκαστρον, "Black Castle"), Greek name of a Roman/Byzantine fort in Late Antiquity on a site directly opposite Asprokastron, but usually taken together.
 Album Castrum ("White Castle"), Latin name
 Cetatea Albă ("White Citadel"), Romanian name
 Moncastro, Italian corruption of Maurokastron used by Genoese traders and during Genoese rule (14th–15th centuries)
 Turla, Turkic
 Akkerman, Ottoman Turkish ("White Castle") and Russian name until 1944
 Aqkermen, Crimean Tatar name
 Belgorod-Dnestrovskiy, Russian (Бе́лгород-Днестро́вский, "White city on the Dniester")

The town became part of the Principality of Moldavia in 1359. The fortress was enlarged and rebuilt in 1407 under Alexander the Good and in 1440 under Stephen II of Moldavia. It fell to Ottoman conquest on August 5, 1487.  The city was known in Romanian as Cetatea Albă with other languages using the Turkish name, Akkerman, or variations of the Turkish name. Since 1944 the city has been known as "Bilhorod-Dnistrovskyi" (Білгород-Дністровський), while on the Soviet geography maps often translated into its Russian equivalent of "Belgorod-Dnestrovskiy" (Бе́лгород-Днестро́вский), literally "white city on the Dniester".

In Western European languages, including English, the city has typically been known by the official name of the time or a transliteration derived from it.

The city's former name Akkerman is still extensively used as a nickname in informal speech and in local media.

History 

In the 6th century BC, Milesian colonists founded a settlement named Tyras on the future location of Bilhorod-Dnistrovskyi, which later came under Roman and Byzantine rule. In Late Antiquity, the Byzantines built a fortress and named it Asprokastron ("White Castle" - a meaning kept in several languages), but it passed out of their control in the 7th-15th centuries under control of Bulgaria, the cities called Belgorod(white city), as it was the border of the Bulgarian empire. The Voskresensk Chronicle lists Bilhorod "at the mouth of the Dniester, above the sea" among the towns controlled by Kyivan Rus'.

Briefly held by the Second Bulgarian Empire in the early 14th century, by the middle of the century it was a Genoese colony. Sfântul Ioan cel Nou (Saint John the New), the patron saint of Moldavia, was martyred in the city in 1330 during a Tatar incursion. In 1391, Cetatea Albă was the last city on the right bank of the Dnister to be incorporated into the newly established Principality of Moldavia, and for the next century was its second major city, the major port and an important fortress.

In 1420, the citadel was attacked for the first time by the Ottomans, but defended successfully by Moldavian Prince Alexander the Kind.

In the 15th century, the port saw much commercial traffic as well as being frequently used for passenger traffic between central Europe and Constantinople. Among the travellers who passed through the town was John VIII Palaiologos. Following the Fall of Constantinople to the Ottomans in 1453, Sultan Mehmed II brought in colonists from Asprokastron to repopulate the city.

In 1484, along with Kiliia, it was the last of the Black Sea ports to be conquered by the Ottomans. The Moldavian prince Stephen the Great was unable to aid in its defence, being under threat of a Polish invasion. The citadel surrendered when the Ottomans claimed to have reached an agreement with Prince Stephen, and promised safe passage to the inhabitants and their belongings; however, most of the city-dwellers were slaughtered. Later, attempts by Stephen the Great to restore his rule over the area were unsuccessful. Cetatea Albă was subsequently a base from which the Ottomans were able to attack Moldavia proper. In 1485, Tatars setting out from this city founded Pazardzhik in Bulgaria.

It was established as the fortress of Akkerman, part of the Ottoman defensive system against Poland-Lithuania and, later, the Russian Empire. Major battles between the Ottomans and the Russians were fought near Akkerman in 1770 and 1789. Russia conquered the town in 1770, 1774, and 1806, but returned it after the conclusion of hostilities. It was not incorporated into Russia until 1812, along with the rest of Bessarabia.

On 25 September 1826, Russia and the Ottomans signed here the Akkerman Convention which imposed that the hospodars of Moldavia and Wallachia be elected by their respective Divans for seven-year terms, with the approval of both Powers.

During the Russian Revolution, Akkerman was alternatively under the control of the Ukrainian People's Republic and troops loyal to the government of Soviet Russia. Furthermore, the city and the surrounding district were also claimed by the Moldovan Democratic Republic, which however had no means to enforce such claims on the ground. The city was occupied by the Romanian Army on 9 March 1918, after heavy fighting with local troops led by the Bolsheviks. Formal integration followed later that month, when an assembly of the Moldovan Democratic Republic proclaimed the whole of Bessarabia united with Romania. In the interwar period, projects aimed to expand the city and the port were reviewed. Romania ceded the city to the Soviet Union on 28 June 1940 following the 1940 Soviet Ultimatum, but regained it on 28 July 1941 during the invasion of the USSR by the Axis forces in the course of the Second World War and had it within its boundaries until 22 August 1944 when the Red Army reoccupied the city. The Soviets partitioned Bessarabia, and its southern flanks (including Bilhorod/Belgorod) became part of the Ukrainian SSR, and after 1991, nowadays Ukraine.

Until 18 July 2020, Bilhorod-Dnistrovskyi was incorporated as a city of oblast significance and the center of Bilhorod-Dnistrovskyi Municipality. The municipality was abolished in July 2020 as part of the administrative reform of Ukraine, which reduced the number of raions of Odesa Oblast to seven. The area of Bilhorod-Dnistrovskyi Municipality was merged into Bilhorod-Dnistrovskyi Raion.

Jewish history 
In Jewish sources, the city is referred as Weissenburg and Ir Lavan (both meaning "white city") as well as Akerman (אַקערמאַן). Karaite Jews lived there since the 16th century, some even claim the existence of Khazar Jews in the town as early as the 10th century. In 1897, 5,613 Jews lived in the city (19.9% of the total population). The town Jewish community was influenced mainly from the Jewish community of nearby Odessa. During a pogrom in 1905, eight Jews living in the city were killed. During World War II, most of the Jews living in the city fled to nearby Odessa, where they were later killed. The 800 Jews who were left in the city were shot to death in the nearby Leman River. Around 500 of the prewar town Jews survived the war, and around half of them returned to the city.

Demographics 
As of 1920, the population was estimated at 35,000. 8,000 were Romanian, 8,000 were Jewish, and 5,000 were German. Additional populations included Turks, Greeks, Bulgarians and Russians.

According to the 2001 Ukrainian census, the majority of the city's population are Ukrainians (63%). Other important communities include Russians (28%), Bulgarians (3.7%) and Moldovans/Romanians (1.9%). The language situation is notably different, with Russian-speakers representing a majority (54%), followed by speakers of Ukrainian (42%), Bulgarian (1.6%) and Romanian (1.3%).

Climate 
Bilhorod-Dnistrovskyi has a humid continental climate (Köppen: Dfb bordering on Dfa.).

People from Bilhorod-Dnistrovskyi 
 Nicolas Astrinidis (1921-2010), composer who settled in Greece
 Elena Cernei (1924–2000), Romanian opera singer
 Tamara Tchinarova (1919-2017), ballet dancer
 Vasyl Lomachenko (born 1988), Ukrainian professional boxer
 Jacques Roitfeld (1889–1999), French film producer
 Porfiriy Stamatov (1840–1925), Minister of Justice of Bulgaria (1881)
 Nicolae Văcăroiu (born 1943), former Prime Minister of Romania
 Osip Yermansky (1867-1941), Menshevik economist

Gallery

See also 
 Bilhorod-Dnistrovsky Seaport
 Bilhorod-Dnistrovskyi fortress
 Svitlana Bilyayeva - archaeologist who has worked extensively on the fortress

References

External links 

 Asprocastron, silver coin from 15th century: Principality of Moldavia period

 
Cities in Odesa Oblast
Port cities and towns in Ukraine
Port cities of the Black Sea
Populated places on the Dniester River in Ukraine
Capitals of the counties of Bessarabia
Territories of the Republic of Genoa
Akkermansky Uyezd
Cetatea Albă County
Ținutul Nistru
Holocaust locations in Ukraine
Bilhorod-Dnistrovskyi Raion
Hromadas of Odesa Oblast